Leonardo Ferrel Lobo (7 July 1923 – 11 July 2013) was a Bolivian football midfielder who played for Bolivia in the 1950 FIFA World Cup. He also played for The Strongest.

References

External links

1923 births
2013 deaths
Bolivian footballers
Bolivia international footballers
Association football midfielders
The Strongest players
1949 South American Championship players
1950 FIFA World Cup players